The Loening XFL was a proposed carrier-based fighter aircraft to be built by Loening Aeronautical Engineering for the US Navy. It won a 1933 competition, but Loening was already busy building other aircraft, so the contract was canceled.

Specifications (as designed)

References

Bibliography

Loening FL
Loening aircraft